Riograndia is an extinct genus of tritheledontid cynodonts from the Late Triassic of South America. The type and only species is Riograndia guaibensis. Remains have been found in the Caturrita Formation of the geopark of Paleorrota. It was a small non-mammalian cynodont, with several advanced features also present in mammals. Several specimens of Riograndia guaibensis have been found in the towns of Candelária and Faxinal do Soturno in the Caturrita Formation. The genus defines the Riograndia Assemblage Zone.

Classification 
Riograndia is currently classified as a basal genus in the family Tritheledontidae. Other tritheledontids include the related Irajatherium, and two clades, a more basal group including Sinoconodon, Brasilitherium, Brasilodon, and Morganucodon, and a more derived clade of Chaliminia, Elliotherium, Pachygenelus, Diarthrognathus, and Tritheledon. The below cladogram was found by Martinelli and Rougier in 2007 and modified by Soares et al. in 2011, with Tritheledontidae added after Ruta et al. (2013):

Paleoecology 
 
All specimens of Riograndia come from the Late Triassic aged Caturrita Formation. The formation dates to about 225.25 million years ago. Dinosaurs from the formation only include the sauropodomorphs Unaysaurus and  Guaibasaurus. Among the tetrapods is the procolophonid Soturnia; the sphenodontid Clevosaurus; the lepidosaurian Cargninia; the pterosaurian Faxinalipterus, and an assortment of mammaliamorphs including Riograndia, Brasilodon, and Irajatherium.

References

External links 
  Dinossauros do Rio grande do Sul
  Sociedade Brasileira de Paleontologia

Tritheledontidae
Prehistoric cynodont genera
Norian genera
Late Triassic synapsids of South America
Triassic Brazil
Fossils of Brazil
Paraná Basin
Fossil taxa described in 2001
Taxa named by José Bonaparte